Sadegh Najafi-Khazarlou is an Iranian politician and the fifty-fifth mayor of Tabriz. He was elected by the Islamic City Council of Tabriz on 13 October 2013 and was inaugurated on 15 October 2013 in Saat City Hall.His tenure in Tabriz Municipality ended in 2017.

References

Living people
People from East Azerbaijan Province
1960 births
Mayors of Tabriz